Assen Pandov (Bulgarian: Асен Пандов; born June 15, 1984 in Sofia) is a Bulgarian short track speed skater.

Pandov competed at the 2002 and 2010 Winter Olympics for Bulgaria. In 2002, he finished 4th in his heat of the 500 metres, failing to advance. In 2010, he placed 4th in his opening race of the  1000 metres, again failing to advance. In both races, he placed 31st overall.

As of 2013, Pandov's best performance at the World Championships came in 2010, as part of the Bulgarian 5000m relay team, when he placed 7th. His best individual finish is 16th, in the 500m in 2011.

As of 2013, Pandov has not finished on the podium on the ISU Short Track Speed Skating World Cup. His top World Cup ranking is 16th, in the 500 metres in 2005–06.

References 

1984 births
Living people
Bulgarian male short track speed skaters
Olympic short track speed skaters of Bulgaria
Short track speed skaters at the 2002 Winter Olympics
Short track speed skaters at the 2010 Winter Olympics
Sportspeople from Sofia